The Mousehole Cat is a children's book written by Antonia Barber and illustrated by Nicola Bayley. Based on the legend of Cornish fisherman Tom Bawcock and the stargazy pie, it tells the tale of a cat who goes with its owner on a fishing expedition in rough and stormy seas. The book has won awards, including the 1998 British Book Award for Illustrated Children's Book of the Month. It has since been adapted into a 2015 animated film, a puppet show and is being adapted as a stage musical.

Plot
One very stormy winter, none of the fishermen of the village of Mousehole  in Cornwall have been able to leave the harbour for a long while and the village is near starvation. Tom Bawcock (only called 'Tom' in the book) and his loyal black and white cat, Mowzer, decide to brave the storms and set sail to catch some fish. When the boat hits the storm, it is represented by a giant "Storm-Cat", which allows Mowzer to eventually save the day by soothing the storm with her purring. This purring becomes a song and while the Storm-Cat is resting Tom is able to haul in his catch and return to harbour. When they arrive back at the village, the entire catch is cooked into various dishes, including half a hundred "star-gazy" pies, on which the villagers feast.

Layout
The book is laid out to encourage reading with a child; it is wide enough to fit across two laps. The illustrations are "framed" within the pages, with a general background of a seascape and the illustration related to the page shown in a window.

Awards
Besides winning the Illustrated Children's Book of the Year at the 1991 British Book Awards and the British Design Production Award (Children's Books), the book was shortlisted for the Nestlé Smarties Book Prize children's choice, the Children's Book Award and was commended for the Kate Greenaway Medal.

Other versions
In 1994, Grasshopper Productions and The Red Green & Blue Company created an animated version of the tale for Channel 4, narrated by Sian Phillips. In 2011, the tale was adapted into a puppet show by PuppetCraft. The book has been featured on Jackanory Junior for the BBC, read by Shobna Gulati; it was first broadcast on 22 June 2007.

References

External links

1991 children's books
British Book Award-winning works
Cornwall in fiction
Books about cats
Mousehole